Aditi Singh is an Indian actress. She made her Telugu film debut in Guppedantha Prema in 2016.

Personal life
Born in Delhi to Shraddhha Singh and Jainendra Pratap Singh (former Bollywood actor, in Dayavan, Kohraam, Deewana Mujh Sa Nahin and many other films), Singh was brought up in Mumbai where she did her schooling from Jamnabai Narsee School, Juhu and further completed her studies from Mithibai College of Arts. The niece of actor Aditya Pancholi through her mother, her family roots are from Rajasthan.

Her exposure to films from a very young age kindled her interest in acting, which inclined her to participate in several school plays and skits. Also having singing as a hobby, Singh became the lead singer in the school band in 9th grade, winning several interschool competitions. She was trained in classical kathak dance in India by the late Sitara Devi's daughter Jayanti Mala.

Career
Singh started her career at a young age, featuring in a Clean & Clear viral advertisement at age 15.

She then played the female lead in the Telugu romance movie Guppedantha Prema. She turned 17 while filming this movie. She received good feedback for her debut film.

She will appear in another Telugu film, Nenu Kidnap Iyanu, starring Posani Krishnamurali in the lead; it is presently being filmed.

She appeared in Pakistani film Wujood. And Currently doing another Pakistani film Chaa Jaa Re.

Filmography

References

External links
 

Living people
Actresses from Delhi
Actresses from Mumbai
Indian film actresses
Actresses in Hindi cinema
Actresses in Urdu cinema
Actresses in Telugu cinema
Child actresses in Telugu cinema
Rajasthani people
Indian expatriate actresses in Pakistan
Mithibai College alumni
Year of birth missing (living people)
21st-century Indian child actresses
21st-century Indian actresses